"Thiago Silva" is a song by British rappers Dave and AJ Tracey, released as a single on 13 May 2016. The song is produced by 169 and samples Ruff Sqwad's "Pied Piper". The song title refers to Brazilian footballer Thiago Silva. Complex magazine ranked the song at number 10 on their list of "Grime's Most Impactful Songs of the 2010s".

Usage in media
A clip of Dave inviting a fan, Alex, on-stage during a performance of the track at Glastonbury Festival 2019 went viral in July 2019.

Commercial performance
In March 2020, the track was certified as Platinum by the British Phonographic Industry for exceeding chart sales of 600,000, followed by double Platinum in 2023.

After the viral performance at Glastonbury Festival 2019, "Thiago Silva" entered the UK Singles Chart at number 57 before reaching a peak of number 36.

Charts

Certifications

References

2016 singles
2016 songs
Dave (rapper) songs
AJ Tracey songs
Songs written by AJ Tracey
Songs written by Dave (rapper)
Cultural depictions of Brazilian men